Nguyễn Hải Anh (born 15 September 1987) is a Vietnamese footballer who plays as a striker for and captains Bà Rịa–Vũng Tàu.

International career 
In 2013, he made a debut match against UAE in the 2015 AFC Asian Cup qualification. In 2014, in friendly matches against Myanmar and Hong Kong, he scored four goals, two goals per game.

He was called up to the national team attending the 2014 AFF Championship.

International goals

References

External links 

1987 births
Living people
Vietnamese footballers
Vietnam international footballers
V.League 1 players
Dong Nai FC players
People from Nghệ An province
Association football forwards
Dong Thap FC players